The Natural History Museum of Nantes is a French natural history museum located in the city of Nantes.

Gallery

1793 establishments in France
Natural history museums in France
Museums in Nantes